Fly by Night is a Canadian adventure series that aired for one season in 1991 as part of CBS' Crimetime After Primetime programming block in the United States. Co-produced by France, Canada and the U.S., the show stars David James Elliott as Mack Sheppard and François Guétary as Jean-Philippe Pasteur, both pilots for a small-time airline, "Slick Air", owned by Sally "Slick" Monroe (Shannon Tweed).

Cast
Shannon Tweed as Sally "Slick" Monroe
David James Elliott as Mack Sheppard
François Guétary as Jean-Phillipe Pasteur

Episodes

References

External links
 
 

1991 Canadian television series debuts
1991 Canadian television series endings
Aviation television series
1990s Canadian drama television series
CBS original programming
English-language television shows